James McKendrick (8 August 1864 – 16 October 1938) was a Scotland international rugby union player.

Rugby Union career

Amateur career

He played for West of Scotland.

International career

McKendrick was capped just the once for Scotland, in 1889 against Ireland at Belfast.

Family

His father was James Grierson McKendrick (1826-1896), his mother was Margaret Gibson (1826-1906).

He married Caroline Laidlaw (1871-1937) in Edinburgh in 1864. They had 6 children, but not all survived infancy.

References

1864 births
1938 deaths
Rugby union players from South Lanarkshire
Scottish rugby union players
Scotland international rugby union players
West of Scotland FC players
Rugby union forwards